Wilf or Wilfred Smith may refer to:

Wilfrid Smith (British Army officer) (1867–1942), British general
Wilf Smith (footballer, born 1917) (1917–1995), former Port Vale footballer
Wilf Smith (footballer, born 1918), English-born former Bristol Rovers footballer
Wilf Smith (footballer, born 1946), German-born former Bristol Rovers footballer
Wilfrid Smith (1899–1976), American football player and sports writer for the Chicago Tribune
Wilfred Cantwell Smith (1916–2000), Canadian professor of comparative religion
Wilfred Davy Smith (1881–1942), physician and politician in Ontario, Canada
Wilfred I. Smith (1919–1998), Canadian Dominion archivist
Wilfred Smith (footballer) (born 1910), English former footballer, who played for Rotherham United and Burnley
Wilfred Talbot Smith (1885–1957), occultist and follower of Aleister Crowley